The 1977 Commonwealth Heads of Government Meeting, officially known as the IV Commonwealth Heads Meeting, and commonly known as London 1977, was the fourth Meeting of the Heads of Government of the Commonwealth of Nations. It was held in London, United Kingdom, and was hosted by that country's Prime Minister, James Callaghan. President Idi Amin of Uganda did not attend, and on the eve of the meeting President James Mancham of the Seychelles was overthrown in a coup d'état and the country was not represented.

Issues discussed at the conference included the situation in Southern Africa, relations between rich and poorer nations, Cyprus, Belize, Uganda, and the issue of sporting contacts with South Africa. The Gleneagles Agreement on sporting contacts was reached at the meeting's retreat, in Gleneagles, Scotland.

References

1977
Diplomatic conferences in the United Kingdom
20th-century diplomatic conferences
1977 conferences
1977 in international relations
1977 in the United Kingdom
United Kingdom and the Commonwealth of Nations
June 1977 events in the United Kingdom
1970s in the City of Westminster